Elisa Gernaela Juana Raquel Nicora de Panza (1912–2001) was an Argentinian botanist noted for her research on grasses, especially Malpighiaceae, Caryophyllaceae, Gramineae.  She was a founding member of the Argentine Society of Botany, and was a curator at two herbaria.   In the course of her career, she described over sixty species and gathered thousands of specimens.

References 

 1912 births
 2001 deaths
 Argentine women scientists
20th-century Argentine botanists
Women botanists
20th-century women scientists